Guitar Mashing is the second studio album produced by session guitarist and multi instrumentalist and composer Tim Scott, first released on 26 November 2008.

The album artwork features a fictional dictionary definition for the term Guitar Mashing which was in part derived from the official Oxford English Dictionary definitions for the words Guitar and Mash but heavily distorted for use as a propaganda tool to assist in marketing the album's unusual genre.

The album was recorded and mixed at Acer Studios in Greater Manchester by Tim Scott and was mastered by Geoff Pesche at Abbey Road Studios, London.

Track listing

Personnel

Tim Scott Plays:

Guitars: Electric Guitars, Acoustic Guitar, Spanish Classical Guitar, Slide Guitar, Talk Box Guitar, and Utterly Inspirational Whammy Wah Guitar
Bass: Four & Five String Electric Bass Guitars Keyboards: Strings, Pads, Special Effects and Exclusive Sample Manipulation
Vocals: Background Vocal Harmonies, Shouts, Whistles, Whispers and Effects
Percussion: Tambourines, Indian Finger Cymbals, Bongos, Shakers, Claves, Chunky Silver Wrist Chain, Jam Bells, Tri-Tone Samba Whistle, Flex-A-Tone, Chimes, Air Horn, Vibra-Slap, Bell Tree, Castanets, Agogo Bells, Cabassa, Cowbells, Handclaps, Sambago Bells, Earth Plates, Jam Blocks, Steel & Chrome Kitchen Bin, Triangles and Finger Clicks
Drums: KD Snare, Loblan Cowboy Boot Kick Drum Stomps, Zildjian Hi-Hats, Ride, Crash, Splash & China Trash Cymbals Electronic
Drums & Drum Programming: Roland V-Drums arranged via midi on a Roland Fantom X6 Workstation and Sampler.
All songs written, arranged & played by: Tim Scott
All songs published by: (T. Scott) Acer Records (MCPS)
 Produced by: Tim Scott
Recorded & mixed by: Tim Scott at Acer Studios, Greater Manchester

Release history

References

External links
[ allmusic]
discogs
Acer Records discogs discography

2008 albums
Instrumental albums